Frances Finch may refer to:
Frances Finch, (17th–18th century), Countess of Winchilsea and Weymouth, wife of Thomas Thynne, 1st Viscount Weymouth, daughter of 3rd Earl of Winchilsea,
Frances Finch, Countess of Dartmouth and Aylesford (1761–1838), English aristocrat,  wife of George Legge, 3rd Earl of Dartmouth, daughter of 3rd Earl of Aylesford
Frances Finch, Countess of Winchilsea and Nottingham (c. 1690 – 1734), English aristocrat and social reformer, wife of 8th Earl of Winchilsea, daughter of 4th Earl of Denbigh
Gloria Frances Finch (1910–2010), better known as Gloria Stuart  American actress and artist
Caroline Frances Finch, Australian sports injury expert

See also
 Francis Finch (disambiguation)